Dolly Green (September 19, 1906 – September 4, 1990) was an American heiress, philanthropist and thoroughbred owner.

Early life
Dorothy Wellborn Green was born in September 19, 1906 to Burton E. Green (1868-1965), oilman and co-founder of Beverly Hills, California, and Lillian Wellborn. Her maternal grandfather was Judge Olin Wellborn (1848-1921). In 1979, she inherited part of the $3.6-billion sale of her father's Belridge Oil Company to Shell Oil Co. She graduated from the Marlborough School. She later served on the board of trustees of the Burton E. Green Foundation.

Thoroughbreds and philanthropy
Green spent US$2.2 million for five yearlings at a horse sale at the Keeneland in Lexington, Kentucky in 1980. Later, she owned seventy-four thoroughbreds. In 1984, she established the Dolly Green Equine Research Lab of the Southern California Equine Foundation at the Hollywood Park Racetrack in Inglewood, California. In 1986 at Santa Anita Park in Arcadia, California her horse Brave Raj won the US$1 million Breeders' Cup Juvenile Fillies and would later be voted the Eclipse Award for American Champion Two-Year-Old Filly. The Dolly Green Research Foundation, affiliated with the Southern California Equine Foundation, ranks as the second-largest private foundation dedicated to research on equine health issues. She socialized with Leslie Combs II, owner of Spendthrift Farm in Lexington, Kentucky.

Green started the Dolly Green Scholars Award at UCLA's Jules Stein Eye Institute. She was a former member of the Los Angeles Junior League and the advisory board of the Los Angeles Orphanage Guild.

Personal life 
Green resided in Bel Air, Los Angeles. She was a billionaire, and one of the richest people in California. She died on September 4, 1990 and was buried in Holy Cross Cemetery in Culver City, California.

References

External links
 A $1B Estate, 74 Horses and a Secret Daughter: Meet the Original Real Housewife of Beverly Hills, The Hollywood Reporter.

1906 births
1990 deaths
People from Bel Air, Los Angeles
American racehorse owners and breeders
American billionaires
Female billionaires
20th-century American philanthropists